Big Band Machine is a jazz album recorded by Buddy Rich and his big band, released on the Groove Merchant Record label in 1975.

Track listing
LP side A:
"Three Day Sucker" (Lofgreen) – 6:50	
"Tommy Medley" (Townshend) – 12:26
"Eyesight to the Blind"
"Champagne"
"See Me, Feel Me"
"Miracle Cure"
"Listening to You"	
LP side B:
"On Broadway" (Mann, Weil, Leiber, Stoller) – 3:48
"Pieces of Dreams" (Legrand) – 4:30
"Ease On Down the Road" (Smalls) – 3:30
"West Side Story [medley] '75" (Bernstein, Sondheim) – 5:27

bonus tracks added to 2003 CD re-issue (P-Vine, Japan):
"Nik Nik" – 2:52
"Layin' it Down" – 2:50

bonus tracks added to 2005 CD re-issue (LRC Records):
"Playhouse" (Albam) – 6:26
"Lush Life" (Loose) – 4:09

"Three Day Sucker" arranged by Lofgreen
"Tommy" Medley arranged by Michael Longo
"On Broadway" arranged by Dave Marowitz
"Pieces of Dream" arranged by Richard Lieb
"Ease on Down the Road" arranged by David Berger
"West Side Story" Medley arranged by Bill Reddie

Reception
The Allmusic awarded the album 3 stars.

Personnel
 William "Bill" Blount – alto saxophone player cited incorrectly in liner notes as Bill "Blaut" 
 Peter Yellin – alto saxophone
 Steve Marcus – tenor saxophone, soprano saxophone
 Bob Mintzer – tenor saxophone
 Roger Rosenberg – baritone saxophone
 Lloyd Michels – trumpet
 Charles Camilleri – trumpet
 Danny Hayes – trumpet
 Richard Hurwitz – trumpet
 Ross Konikoff – trumpet
 Barry Maur – trombone
 Gerald Chamberlain – trombone
 Anthony Salvatori – bass trombone
 Cliff Morris – guitar
 Cornell Dupree – guitar
 Wayne Wright – guitar
 Greg Kogan – piano
 Ben Brown – bass
 Buddy Rich – drums
 Ray Armondo – congas

References

Groove merchant GM 3307 (1975 LP)
Simitar Distribution 1290 (1999 CD)
P-Vine Records	23460 (2003 CD)
LRC Records 24105 (2005 CD)
Big Band Machine at discogs.com

1975 albums
Buddy Rich albums
Albums produced by Sonny Lester
Groove Merchant albums